Gábor Melegh (14 May 1801, Vršac - 4 April 1832, Vienna) was an Austrian lithographer and painter of Hungarian ancestry, who worked in the Biedermeier style.

Life and work
His ancestry can be traced to an old noble family, based in Timișoara, and his father was a judge's assistant. He began studying art in his hometown then, from 1817 to 1829, he was enrolled at the Academy of Fine Arts, Vienna, but did not attend continuously. In 1818, he was awarded their Gundel-Prize for excellence. During breaks from the Academy, he returned home to work. He also took students; Károly Brocky being the best known. Some of his works appeared in magazines, notably the literary journal, Aurora, published by his friend, Károly Kisfaludy.

Although it was once widely believed that he drowned in the sea off Trieste in 1835, while on a study trip, the death register at St. Stephen's Cathedral, Vienna, indicates that he died three years previously.

His works include watercolors, miniatures, chalk drawings, lithographs and etchings. His drawings and two oil paintings may be seen in the Hungarian National Gallery. Most of his oil paintings are portraits of people from the upper classes. Famous during his lifetime, he was quickly forgotten after his death.

Sources
 Biographical notes @ Képzőművészet Magyarországon
 Biography and appreciation @ Hét Nap
 Biographical notes @ Kieselbach Gallery

External links

1801 births
1832 deaths
Austrian painters
Austrian lithographers
Austrian people of Hungarian descent
Academy of Fine Arts Vienna alumni
People from Vršac